Dirk-Ulrich Mende (born 26 December 1957 in Münster) is a German politician of the Social Democratic Party (SPD) who has been serving as a member of the German Bundestag since 2023.  and was the Lord Mayor (Oberbürgermeister) of the town of Celle in North Germany.

Early life and education
Mende studied law in Marburg and Göttingen and passed his state legal exams in 1987. 

Thereafter Mende was employed as the president of the regional council in Kassel, at the former Federal Office for the Recognition of Refugees (now the Federal Ministry of Migration (Bundesamt für Migration), at the Hesse State Welfare Agency (Landeswohlfahrtsverband Hessen) in Kassel, at the Schleswig-Holstein State Insurance Institution (Landesversicherungsanstalt Schleswig-Holstein) and at Lower Saxony's State Ministry for Social Welfare, Women, Families and Health (Niedersächsisches Ministerium für Soziales, Frauen, Familie und Gesundheit).

Political career
From 1999 to 2003 Mende was the leader of the SPD party in the State Parliament of Lower Saxony. From 2003 to 2008 Mende was the divisional head (Referatsleiter) of the Lower Saxon Ministry for Home Affairs, Sport and Integration. There he worked for five years in the area of administrative modernisation and then in the field of integration.  

From 22 February 2009 Mende served as the Lord Mayor (Oberbürgermeister) of the town of Celle in Lower Saxony, having won at the first vote with a clear and "surprising" majority of 50.8%. He has been elected for a term of office lasting to 2017.

Mende lost the 2016 elections against his CDU opponent Jörg Nigge. Therefore, his regular period in office ended in February 2017.

In the 2021 German federal election, he contested Celle – Uelzen but came second. In 2023, he moved up the list after Andreas Philippi resigned.

Since 1975 Mende has been a member of the SPD and since 1972 an honorary member of the Worker's Welfare Association (Arbeiterwohlfahrt).

Personal life
Mende is married with three children.

References

External links 

1957 births
Living people
Mayors of places in Lower Saxony
Members of the Bundestag for Lower Saxony
21st-century German politicians
Members of the Bundestag 2021–2025
Social Democratic Party of Germany politicians
People from Münster